The Alcoa is a river of Portugal, flowing into the Atlantic Ocean. It rises in the municipality of Alcobaça and flows into the ocean near Nazaré. The river section below the confluence with its tributary Baça is also referred to as Alcobaça.

References

Rivers of Portugal
Drainage basins of the Atlantic coast of Iberia